Baubo (Ancient Greek: Βαυβώ) is an old woman in Greek mythology which appears particularly in the myths of the early Orphic religion. Known as the goddess of mirth, she is depicted as bawdy and sexually liberated, and is said to have jested with Demeter when that god was mourning the loss of her daughter, Persephone.

Scholarly discussion
In The Greek Myths (1955), Robert Graves writes that when the disguised Demeter was the guest of King Celeus in Eleusis, the king's lame maid Iambe:
  

Graves writes: 

The following excerpt is taken from Clement of Alexandria's Exhortation to the Greeks, from a 1919 English translation:

Baubo figurines
Figurines known as Baubos are found in a number of settings, usually with Greek connections. They were mass-produced in a number of styles, but the basic figure always exposes the vulva in some way:

 A plump woman with her legs held apart, gesturing to her exposed vulva.
 A naked splay-legged figure holding a harp on the back of a boar.
 A naked headless torso with the face in the body and the vulva in the chin of the face.
 A seated figure with an exaggerated vulva filling the space between the legs.
 A naked squatting figure with her hands on her genitalia

The figurines usually had elaborate headdresses, and some hold cups or harps. Some figurines have a loop moulded into the head, which seems to indicate that they were suspended in some way (possibly as an amulet).

See also
Anasyrma
Dilukai
Headless men
Lajja Gauri
Nin-imma
Sheela na Gig
Vagina and vulva in art
Venus figurines

References

Bibliography

The following books are mostly about medieval sexual sculpture but  have sections on Baubo:
 Dr. Jørgen Andersen, The Witch on the Wall: Medieval Erotic Sculpture in the British Isles, 1977.
 Miriam Robbins Dexter and Victor H. Mair, Sacred Display: Divine and Magical Female Figures of Eurasia. Amherst, New York: Cambria Press, 2010.
 Anthony Weir and James Jerman, Images of Lust: Sexual Carvings on Medieval Churches, 1986.

External links
 Examples of Baubo figurines
 Baubo in Clement of Alexandria's Exhortation to the Greeks The story of Baubo as related by Clement of Alexandria.
 Baubo figurines from the temple of Demeter at Priene, Turkey Face-in-body Baubo figurines.

Eleusinian Mysteries
Fertility goddesses
Women and sexuality
Sexuality in arts
Human gender and sexuality symbols
Yonic symbols
Nudity in mythology
Vagina
Deeds of Demeter